Zeb Tsikira is a Zimbabwean real estate entrepreneur living in Canada. He is also a book author.

Background
Zeb Tsikira was born in Bulawayo where he grew up in Nketa suburb. He had his early education at Manondwane Primary School and high school at Hamilton Boys High School. He then relocated to Canada in 2001 with his family.

In 2010 Tsikira dropped out of university where he was studying psychology with the University of Ottawa. He then established Canvestus Group and Nyon Communications 2013 specialized in real estate and property development. Tsikira was recognised at Zimbabwe Achievers Awards 2019 as Male entrepreneur of the year.

He is a contributing donor to L'Arche Zimbabwe and is involved in music production in Zimbabwe.

Books

References

Year of birth missing (living people)
Living people
People from Bulawayo
Zimbabwean emigrants to Canada
Zimbabwean writers
Canadian male non-fiction writers
Zimbabwean businesspeople
Canadian businesspeople
Zimbabwean philanthropists
Canadian philanthropists
Zimbabwean record producers
Canadian record producers